The Gold panda molly is a molly found in the aquarium trade. The molly is thought to have been a hybrid of the gold dust molly and possibly the Dalmatian molly. It most likely does not live in the wild. The sailfin molly (Poecilia latipinna) and the common molly (Poecilia sphenops) are included in the cross, and some breeders have considered the Latin name of the gold panda molly to be Poecilia sphenops more likely than Poecilia latipinna.

History
A man who bred a hybrid called the gold dust molly and others is said to have decided to breed a new type. This type was made by combining the gold dust molly and another species. It is likely that the dalmatian or black molly were involved in the mix, and created the gold panda molly.

In aquariums
The gold panda molly does well with other mollies, corydoras, guppies, Neon tetras, and Zebra danios. It prefers water with a pH level of 6-8 and will eat flakes and pellets. It is a very peaceful fish. Females at times can be quite aggressive depending on the temperament.

References

Poecilia
Fish hybrids